Đorđe Stojšić may refer to:

Đorđe Stojšić (Serbian politician, born 1928)
Đorđe Stojšić (Serbian politician, born 1977)